Dok Ricky, Pedia ng Barangay is a Philippine situational comedy and commentary show broadcast by ABS-CBN, starring Dominic Ochoa, Louise Abuel, Yen Santos and Alessandra de Rossi. The show aired from September 9, 2017 to January 18, 2020, and aired every Saturday mornings from 8:00AM to 8:30AM on the network's Yes Weekend! block. It also aired worldwide via TFC. The sitcom tackles the events in the first 1000 days of a child from conception up to second birth age. The series returned on Kapamilya Channel January 30, 2022 but only for reruns from past episodes.

Synopsis
Dok Ricky is a pediatrician and single father who arrives to the health clinic of the fictional town of Barangay Masigla to help the community care for its babies and children. He will be surrounded by the townspeople who will make their journey to healthier minds and nourishing hearts become more energetic.

Cast

Main cast
 Dominic Ochoa as Ricardo "Dok Ricky" Santos, Pedia
 Louise Abuel as Johann Santos
 Alessandra de Rossi as Dra. Marikina "Dok Riki" Bautista
 Kristel Fulgar as Trixie
 CJ Navato as Thor
 Nash Aguas as Ash
 Lotlot Bustamante as Kap Cora
 Rj Seggara as Tatang
 Yen Santos as Teacher Julia

Supporting cast
 Epy Quizon as Dok Martin
 Kate Alejandrino as Queenie
 Donna Cariaga as Donna
 Don Jake Consuegra as Bruce
 James Caraan as Joey
 Nomer Tajonera as Tony
 Alora Sasam as Melanie
 Sam Shoaf as Albert
 Luke Alford as Michael
 Krystal Brimner as Angel

Guest cast
 Mitch Naco as Mae
 Francine Diaz as Lindsey
 Ryan Rems as Aaron
 Igiboy Flores as Mr. Chanz
 Tart Carlos as Lynda
 Viveika Ravanes as Lynette
 EJ Jallorina as RJ
 Meg Imperial as Samantha
 Cindy Miranda as Irene
 Joj Agpangan as Elsa
 Raine Salamante as Leslie Fae
 KaladKaren Davila as herself
 Assunta de Rossi as Dok Vicky
 Victor Anastacio as Scott
 Anthony Andres as Edmund
 Peachie Dioquino-Valera as Pops

See also
 List of programs broadcast by ABS-CBN
 List of programs broadcast by Kapamilya Channel
 ABS-CBN Foundation
 National Nutrition Council (Philippines)

References

External links
 Dok Ricky, Pedia on Facebook
 Dok Ricky, Pedia on Twitter
 Dok Ricky, Pedia on Instagram

2017 Philippine television series debuts
2020 Philippine television series endings
ABS-CBN News and Current Affairs shows
ABS-CBN original programming
Filipino-language television shows
Philippine comedy television series
Philippine documentary television series
Philippine television sitcoms